Meprin A (endopeptidase-2, meprin-a, meprin, N-benzoyl-L-tyrosyl-p-aminobenzoic acid hydrolase, PABA-peptide hydrolase, PPH) is an enzyme that cleaves protein and peptide substrates preferentially on carboxyl side of hydrophobic residues. This metalloprotease can be associated with inflammatory responses. It can be found in the extracellular space where it can also form complex structures by joining its monomers together.

Meprin A is a dimer composed of the products transcribed from the following two genes:

References 

EC 3.4.24
Single-pass transmembrane proteins